Binnsville (variant name Binnville) is a ghost town in Kemper County, Mississippi, United States.

Once a thriving commercial and educational center, nothing remains of Binnsville but a church and cemetery.

History
The earliest record of settlement was the Chapman (or Chatam) Church, organized about 1840.  Later known as the Prairie Church, and then the Binnsville United Methodist Church, it was rebuilt in 1974.

The settlement's namesake, George Binn, located to the area in the 1870s and opened a store with a post office.

By the late 1800s, Binnsville's population had grown to approximately 500, and it was described as "a bustling town" and "a thriving and prosperous community".  The settlement had as many as 16 stores, a post office, two drug stores, three churches, a Masonic Grand Lodge, a cotton gin and a grist mill.  Binnsville Cemetery was located south of the settlement.

In 1886, the Mississippi Legislature passed a law stating that "no intoxicating liquors shall be sold or given away within one mile of Chapman Church, situated at Binnsville".

Fairview Male and Female College, a segregated white facility, was established in Binnsville in 1887, and featured dormitories for both sexes.  Described as "a school of more than local reputation", it had an enrollment of 150 in 1892, and was the first co-educational school in Kemper County.  A noted graduate was Alabama senator John H. Pinson.  The school closed in 1904.

Decline
The area became isolated when the state abandoned dredging operations on the Noxubee River, reducing riverboat access.

Notable person
 Doc Land, former Major League Baseball outfielder

References

Former populated places in Kemper County, Mississippi
Former populated places in Mississippi